FLPD may refer to:

Fort Lauderdale Police Department
Fort Lee Police Department